Joey Abell (born May 16, 1981) is an American professional boxer.

Personal life
Abell is a native of Minneapolis, Minnesota. He attended Champlin Park High School, and later played football at South Dakota State University, where he majored in Education and Human Science.

Amateur career
As an amateur, Abell won a silver medal at the 1998 U.S. Junior Championships at 201 lbs, losing to Malik Scott in the final. He later won gold in the super heavyweight division at the 1999 Under-19 Championships.

Professional career
The first fight of Abell's professional career was marred when his opponent, Ritchie Goosehead, fell through the ropes and landed on the cement. The fight was ruled a no-contest.  Abell knocked out Goosehead in his second professional fight about a month later.  Abell remained undefeated through ten bouts, then he was KOd by Aaron Lyons at The Blue Horizon in Philadelphia, Pennsylvania. Abell later rematched Lyons and KO'd him. As of May 16, 2009, Abell's professional record was 24 wins (23 by knockout), 4 losses, no draws, and 1 no contest.

Abell defeated his first notable opponent in undefeated Teke Oruh of Nigeria on points, in a fight televised on Showtime on November 16, 2007. Abell then defeated Billy Willis by third round TKO. In 2008 he went on to lose a string of bouts, including a loss to former world champion Alfred Cole. In January 2011 A distracted Abell was defeated in the first round by heavyweight contender Chris Arreola.
Abell's last two losses came at the hands of #2 (Tyson Fury) and #3 (Kubrat Pulev).  Both fights were taken with a couple of days' notice.

On May 17, 2016 Abell knocked out, then undefeated Wes Nofire and continued his winning streak with two more wins coming by way of KO.

Professional boxing record

References

External links
 

1981 births
Living people
Sportspeople from Minneapolis
Heavyweight boxers
Boxers from Minnesota
American male boxers